Pull It may refer to:

"Pull It", a 2009 song by Shystie
"Pull It", a 2015 song by Dillon Francis and Bro Safari from This Mixtape Is Fire